Sathan is a tambon (subdistrict) of Chiang Khong District, in Chiang Rai Province, Thailand. In 2005 it had a population of 9,453 people. The tambon contains 16 villages.

References

Tambon of Chiang Rai province
Populated places in Chiang Rai province